O'Banion is a surname. Notable people with the surname include:

Dean O'Banion (1892–1924), Irish-American mobster
John O'Banion (1947–2007), American singer and actor

See also
O'Banion's, former punk rock club in Chicago
O'Banion Middle School, middle school in Garland, Texas, United States